Avinash Mukund Sable (born 13 September 1994) is an Indian track and field athlete who specializes in 3000 metres steeplechase. He holds the national record of 8:11.20, set at the 2022 Commonwealth Games where he won the silver medal. It was the ninth time he had set the national record.

Early life
Sable was born on 13 September 1994 in Mandwa, Beed district, Maharashtra, into a family of farmers. From age six, he would run or walk the  distance between home and school as there was no transport facility in his village. After completing 12th grade, he joined the 5 Mahar regiment of Indian Army, being posted at the Siachen Glacier in 2013–2014, deserts of north-western Rajasthan, followed by Sikkim from 2015. He first took part in inter-army cross country running in 2015 at the insistence of his colleagues, before switching to steeplechase under trainer Amrish Kumar. Sable, who was overweight, managed to lose  in three months, before joining the national camp where he was trained by Nikolai Snesarev. In 2018, Sable went back to coach Kumar as Snesarev's training routine did not "suit" him.

Career
After failing to qualify for the 2018 Asian Games due to an ankle injury, Sable broke the 37-year-old national record of 8:30.88 held by Gopal Saini, by clocking 8:29.80 at the 2018 National Open Championships in Bhubaneswar. He set a new national record of 8:28.94 in March 2019 at the Federation Cup in Patiala, as a result of which he qualified for the 2019 Asian Athletics Championships and 2019 World Athletics Championships. He became the first male steeplechaser from India to qualify for the World Championships since Deena Ram (1991).

Sable won the silver medal at the 2019 Asian Athletics Championships in Doha, his debut international event, with a timing of 8:30.19. On 1 October 2019, he again broke his own national record at the World Championships where he ran 8:25.23 in the heats, despite twice being at the receiving end of Takele Nigate's accidental tripping during the race, to finish seventh in the heats and out of contention for the final. However, after a successful appeal by the Athletics Federation of India, Sable was included in the final and became the first Indian to qualify for the 3000 metres steeplechase final at the World Championships. He further improved the national record to 8:21.37 in the final, finishing 13th out of 16 runners, and qualified for the 2020 Summer Olympics.

Sable set a new national record at the 2020 Delhi Half Marathon, completing the run in less than 61 minutes.

At the 2020 Summer Olympics, Sable placed seventh in the heats, setting a new national record to 8:18.12. He was the fastest non-qualifier across all heats. In 2022, Sable set 2 further national records, first at the Indian Grand Prix (8:16.21), and then at the Meeting International Mohamed VI in Rabat (8:12.48), placing 5th (his highest Diamond League finish to date).

Sable won the silver medal at the 2022 Commonwealth Games with a new national record time of 8:11.20. It was also the first time an athlete from outside Kenya had won a medal in men's 3000 metres steeplechase at the Commonwealth Games since 1994.

References

External links
 

1994 births
Indian Army personnel
Indian male steeplechase runners
Living people
Athletes from Maharashtra
People from Beed district
Athletes (track and field) at the 2020 Summer Olympics
Olympic athletes of India
Athletes (track and field) at the 2022 Commonwealth Games
Commonwealth Games silver medallists for India
Commonwealth Games medallists in athletics
Recipients of the Arjuna Award
Medallists at the 2022 Commonwealth Games